TASTE Holdings is a South African management group with subsidiaries in the food and jewellery market. It is listed on the JSE with ticker symbol is of TAS, after it have been moved from the AltX board in June 2011.

History 
TASTE Holdings has been part of the Endeavor (non-profit) network since 2007.

TASTE Holdings has sold its hospitality service interests and has been renamed to Luxe Holdings Limited since 2020.

Subsidiaries

Food 
 Maxi's - a chain of restaurants
 Scooters Pizza - a chain of pizza take-away outlets (It predates TASTE Holdings)
 St. Elmo's - a chain of pizza restaurants (acquired November 2010)
 Fish and Chip Co. - a chain of seafood take-away restaurants (acquired February 2012)
Dominos Pizza -  an American multinational pizza restaurant chain
Starbucks - an American multinational chain of coffeehouses and roastery reserves

Jewellery
 NWJ Jewellery - a jewellery chain (acquired August 2008)

Owners
 Nando's owns approximately 14.5% of TASTE holdings.
 Brimstone Investments Corporation owns approximately 12%

References

External links
 Official website
 Corporate Information page
 Results presentation 2009
 JSE information page

Food and drink companies of South Africa
Companies listed on the Johannesburg Stock Exchange
Jewellery companies of South Africa